Kutak Rock LLP is a US law firm, founded in 1965 in Omaha, Nebraska.  it had more than 500 attorneys in 19 offices across the U.S.  In 2020, Kutak Rock LLP was ranked as the 94th largest law firm in the U.S. based on number of attorneys and 124th based on revenue.

History
The firm was founded in Omaha in 1965 by Robert J. Kutak, Harold Rock, and William G. Campbell.  After 1972 the firm pursued an aggressive expansion strategy, first by absorbing two other Omaha firms and then by adding offices in other cities, beginning in 1977 with offices in Denver and Washington, D.C. By 1978 the firm, with its main concentration in public finance law, was reported to be the fastest growing law firm in the United States.

Federal legislation in 1968 required American industry and business to commit to massive expenditures over the next two decades to address water and air pollution abatement requirements of that legislation. In conjunction with its Wall Street investment banking clients, Kutak Rock pioneered the use of municipal debt backed solely by the relevant corporate credit (a form of transaction at that time known as industrial development revenue bond financing) to finance tens of billions of dollars of these requirements, thus establishing the foundation of the broad-ranging corporate and governmental finance practice that exists today in all of the firm's offices. The firm's national corporate, real estate and litigation practices also began during this period.

Robert Kutak, a founder of the firm, chaired the American Bar Association commission which developed the new Model Rules of Professional Conduct and rewrote ethical standards for lawyers; today, the ABA offers a legal education award named for him.  He was also instrumental in purchasing and preserving the Omaha Bank Building for use as the firm's main office.  He died of a heart attack in 1983, at age 50.

Today, the firm has more than 500 attorneys located in offices coast-to-coast.

Notable alumni

 Robert Kutak, founder of the firm and Chairman of the American Bar Association's Special Commission on Evaluation of Professional Standards 
Harold Rock, founder of the firm, former president of the Omaha Bar Association and Nebraska State Bar Association 
David Karnes, former U.S. Senator for Nebraska, was of counsel to the firm.
David Bracht, former Nebraska Director of Energy, is of counsel to the firm.
 Bart McLeay, candidate for United States Senate for Nebraska in 2014.
 Lindsey Miller-Lerman, Justice of the Nebraska Supreme Court.
 Steve Pedersen, founding member of indie rock band Cursive (band).
 Brian C. Buescher, District Judge of the United States District Court for the District of Nebraska.

Awards 
Awards include:

 The Bond Buyer's 2017 Deal of the Year for the Midwest Region - underwriter's counsel to the Great Lakes Water Authority
 The Bond Buyer's 2017 Small Issuer Deal of the Year - bond counsel to the City of Missoula, Montana
 Human Rights Campaign's Corporate Equality Index "Best Places to Work for LGBT Equality" (multiple years)
 Women in Law Empowerment Forum (WILEF) Gold Standard Certification (multiple years)

References

Law firms established in 1965
Lobbying firms
Companies based in Omaha, Nebraska
Law firms based in Nebraska
1965 establishments in Nebraska